Un Animale utile is a 1951 Italian film written by Attilio Bertolucci and Giulio Bollati, and directed by Antonio Marchi.

Cast

External links
 

1951 films
1950s Italian-language films
Italian black-and-white films
1950s Italian films